Shelby's Raid was an 1863 Confederate cavalry raid from Arkansas into Missouri during the American Civil War. It had not been a good year for the Confederates in Arkansas, with several setbacks. These included the loss of the state capital (Little Rock) and Fort Hindman, and the failure to retake Helena. Colonel Joseph Shelby thought that a fast moving raid could boost morale, acquire recruits, and keep federal troops busy so they couldn't assist in Northern operations elsewhere. His troops fought numerous skirmishes and caused a deal of disruption in Missouri, making it as far north as Waverly, Missouri, before withdrawing to Arkansas. This raid cemented Shelby's reputation as a cavalry commander and made plain that Missouri was still vulnerable to this kind of cavalry raid.

The raid
Shelby had the following goals for his raid: prevent Missouri troops from reinforcing Major General William Rosecrans at Chattanooga, raise recruits, damage as much Federal infrastructure as possible, and raise the fighting spirit of the Confederate Army in the Trans-Mississippi theater.

With the loss of Little Rock on September 10, General Sterling Price moved his forces to near Arkadelphia, Arkansas.  Following this, Shelby proposed to Governor Reynolds a raid into Missouri.  Reynolds consented, followed eventually by Marmaduke, Holmes, Price, and General Kirby Smith.

Shelby's raiders rode from Arkadelphia, Arkansas, on September 22, 1863. On the 27th, while skirmishing with 'Federal outlaws and jayhawkers' twelve miles from the Arkansas River, they ran directly into 200 of the First Arkansas Infantry. Using the cover of heavy timber, the infantry forced Thorp back from range, until the Union troops were scattered by G. P. Gordon and David Shanks. Union troops lost 10 killed, 20 wounded and 50 prisoners. At this point in the raid, Shelby had about 600 men in his ranks. On the 31st, Shelby moved to McKissick's Springs, waiting until Colonel D.C. Hunter joined him with 200 men recently recruited from Missouri and Arkansas.

Crossing into Missouri near Pineville on October 2.   There, Shelby was joined by Colonel J.T. Coffee with 400 men.  At Neosho, Shelby captured the garrison of 300 troops, whom he then paroled.  On the 6th, they passed through Humansville, camped 10 miles from Warsaw, captured 30 government wagons and picked up prisoners, as well as many horses.  On the 7th they reached Warsaw, where they captured the fort with arms, prisoners and provisions.  On the 10th, Tipton was captured with stores of supplies, and the LaMine Bridge was burned.  Captured prisoners were again paroled, and Shelby's men destroyed rail and bridges a band of 60 miles wide, and prisoners were taken at Syracuse.  At Tipton, Colonel T.T. Crittenden (USA) had 1,000 men drawn up against Shelby's troops, but retreated upon being attacked.

Involving 800 soldiers, twelve ammunition wagons, and two pieces of artillery, the raid was a success. Shelby reported that during the thirty days he killed and wounded six hundred Federals, and that he had captured and paroled another 600. He had captured and destroyed ten Union forts, seizing $800,000 dollars in military supplies, which included 600 rifles, forty stands of colors, 399 hundred wagons, and 6,000 horses and mules. He had also destroyed another million dollars in enemy supplies. His own losses would be major, as about one man in six did not return from the raid.

The "Battle of Marshall" and withdrawal
On October 13, 1863, Federal forces were able concentrate to engage Shelby's raiders at the town of Marshall, the county seat of Saline County. A mixed force of 1,800 Federal troops and Missouri State Militia under Brigadier General Egbert B. Brown attempted to surround and trap Shelby's force. However, Shelby divided his force and broke through, escaping the Union encirclement. Confronted with the likelihood of continued Federal concentration, Shelby divided his command and withdrew from Missouri to Arkansas.

Results
Jo Shelby was promoted to brigadier general in the Confederate Army as a result of this successful raid. Shelby claimed to have traveled 1,500 miles, inflicted 600 casualties, and captured or destroyed $1 million worth of goods during the raid.

References

Sources 

 Official Records of the War of the Rebellion, Series I, Volume 22 (Part I), page 621-
 McLachlan, Sean. (2011) ''Ride Around Missouri; Shelby's Great Raid 1863. Osprey Raid Series #25. Osprey Publishing.

External links
 Denny, James M., The Battle of Marshall

1863 in Missouri
Cavalry raids of the American Civil War
Conflicts in 1863
Military operations of the American Civil War in Missouri